Otoucalofa Creek is a stream in the U.S. state of Mississippi.

Otoucalofa is a name derived from the Choctaw language purported to mean either (sources vary) "chestnut stump" or "many prairies". Variant names are "O'Tickalofa Creek", "O'Tuckoloja Creek", "Octukalofa Creek", "Old Tuckolofa Creek", "Otoclaffah Creek", "Otoucalofa Creek Canal", "Otoukalofa Creek", and "Otuckolopha Creek".

References

Rivers of Mississippi
Rivers of Calhoun County, Mississippi
Rivers of Lafayette County, Mississippi
Rivers of Yalobusha County, Mississippi
Mississippi placenames of Native American origin